The 2021–22 season was the 88th season in the existence of Granada CF and the club's third consecutive season in the top flight of Spanish football. In addition to the domestic league, Granada participated in this season's edition of the Copa del Rey.

Players

First-team squad

Reserve team

Out on loan

Transfers

In

Out

Pre-season and friendlies

Competitions

Overall record

La Liga

League table

Results summary

Results by round

Matches
The league fixtures were announced on 30 June 2021.

Copa del Rey

Statistics

Goalscorers

Notes

References

Granada CF seasons
Granada CF